Bruce Musakanya (born 23 February 1994) is a Zambian professional footballer who currently plays for ZESCO United F.C. as a midfielder.

International career

International goals
Scores and results list Zambia's goal tally first.

References

External links 
 

1994 births
Living people
Zambian footballers
Zambia international footballers
2015 Africa Cup of Nations players

Association football midfielders
Zambia A' international footballers
2020 African Nations Championship players